Roy Colsey (born July 29, 1973 in Yorktown Heights, New York) is a former professional lacrosse player who last played for the Philadelphia Barrage in Major League Lacrosse.

College career
Roy attended Syracuse University, where he was a third-team All-American in 1992 and was a first-team All-American from 1993 to 1995. In 1995 he was awarded the Donald McLaughlin Award for National Division 1 Men's Lacrosse Midfielder of the Year. He won two national championships with the Orangemen ('93, '95). He graduated from Syracuse University in 1995.

Professional career

MLL
Colsey played for the Barrage his entire MLL career, and holds several franchise records, including goals, points and two-pointers. In 2004, 2006, and 2007, Roy led the Barrage to MLL championships. In 2006, he was selected to the Men's U.S National Lacrosse Team.

NLL
Before Colsey joined the MLL, he played in the National Lacrosse League (NLL) for nine seasons. He played for the Rochester Knighthawks, New York Saints, New Jersey / Anaheim Storm and Buffalo Bandits. After a two-year break, Colsey returned to the NLL briefly in 2007 with the expansion New York Titans.

Personal
Colsey currently coaches the varsity lacrosse team at Ridgefield High School, where he helped capture the school's first ever FCIAC Championship in Lacrosse and second State Championship. He is the founder and head coach of Team Superstar. He is now a physical education teacher at Robert E. Bell Middle School in Chappaqua, New York, where he has taught since 2003 and has coached extensively.

Statistics

NLL

MLL

References

Awards

See also
 Syracuse Orange men's lacrosse

1973 births
Living people
Syracuse Orange men's lacrosse players
National Lacrosse League All-Stars
New York Titans (lacrosse) players
Buffalo Bandits players
Rochester Knighthawks players
American lacrosse players
Major League Lacrosse players
People from Yorktown Heights, New York